Immigration to Colombia during the early 19th and late 20th Century, What makes it one of the most diverse countries in the world, above other countries in the Latin region. Colombia inherited from the Spanish Empire harsh rules against immigration, first in the Viceroyalty of New Granada and later in the Colombian Republic. The Constituent Assembly of Colombia and the subsequent reforms to the national constitution were much more open to the immigrants and the economic aperture. However naturalization of foreigners, with the exception of those children of Colombians born abroad, it is still difficult to acquire due 'Jus soli' law is not allowed by the government, and only 'Jus sanguinis' law is accepted. Immigration in Colombia is managed by the "Migración Colombia" agency.

Colombia is experiencing large waves of immigration from other Latin American countries, Europe, East Asia, and North America over the past 5 years. due to improvements in quality of life, security, and economic opportunities.

History

Colonial period

European immigration in Colombia began in 1510 with the colonization of San Sebastián de Urabá. In 1526, settlers founded Santa Marta, the oldest Spanish city still in existence in Colombia.
Many Spaniards began their explorations searching for gold, while others Spaniards established themselves as leaders of the native social organizations, teaching natives the Christian faith and the ways of their civilization. Catholic priests would provide education for Native Americans that otherwise was unavailable. Within 100 years after the first Spanish settlement, nearly 95 percent of all Native Americans in Colombia had died. The majority of the deaths of Native Americans were the cause of diseases such as measles and smallpox, which were spread by European settlers.

European (Spanish and French colonist) settlement focused mainly in the Andean highlands and Lebanese for the Caribbean coast, but little European settlement took place in the Choco region of the Pacific coast and the Amazonian plains. Out of all Spanish nationalities, the Castilians and the Basques were the most represented. Over time, Europeans intermarried often with the Amerindian peoples (i.e. the Chibchas), and to produce a mixed-race population which are the majority of people in Colombia today.

European immigration
Colombia was one of the early focus of Basque immigration. Between 1540 and 1559, 8.9 percent of the residents of Colombia were of Basque origin. It has been suggested that the present-day incidence of business entrepreneurship in the region of Antioquia is attributable to the Basque immigration and Basque character traits. Few Colombians of distant Basque descent are aware of their Basque ethnic heritage. In Bogotá, there is a small colony of thirty to forty families who emigrated as a consequence of the Spanish Civil War or because of different opportunities. Basque priests were the ones that introduced handball into Colombia. Basque immigrants in Colombia were devoted to teaching and public administration. In the first years of the Andean multinational company, Basque sailors navigated as captains and pilots on the majority of the ships until the country was able to train its own crews. In December 1941 the United States government estimated that there were 10,000 Germans living in Colombia. There were some Nazi agitators in Colombia, such as Barranquilla businessman Emil Prufurt. Colombia invited Germans who were on the U.S. blacklist to leave. However, most German inhabitants arrived in the late 19th century as farmers and professionals. One such entrepreneur was Leo Siegfried Kopp, the founder of the brewery Bavaria. SCADTA, a Colombian-German air transport corporation which was established by German expatriates in 1919, was the first commercial airline in the western hemisphere.

Arab immigration
The first and largest wave of immigration from the Arab world (mainly the Levant countries) began around 1880, and remained during the first two decades of the 20th century. They were mainly from Lebanon, Jordan and Palestine, fleeing the then colonized Ottoman Turkey territories. Syrians, Palestinians, and Lebanese continued since then to settle in Colombia. Due to poor existing information it's impossible to know the exact number of Lebanese and Syrians that immigrated to Colombia. A figure of 40,000-50,000 from 1880 to 1930 may be reliable. Whatever the figure, Syrians and Lebanese are perhaps the biggest immigrant group next to the Spanish since independence. Those who left their homeland in the Middle East to settle in Colombia left for different reasons such as religious, economic, and political reasons. Some left to experience the adventure of migration. After Barranquilla and Cartagena, Bogotá stuck next to Cali, among cities with the largest number of Arabic-speaking representatives in Colombia in 1945. The Arabs that went to Maicao were mostly Sunni Muslim with some Druze and Shiites, as well as Orthodox and Maronite Christians. The mosque of Maicao is the second largest mosque in Latin America. Middle Easterns are generally called Turco or Turkish. although they are primarily Christian Arab immigrants from what was then the Ottoman Empire.

East Asian immigration 
The Eastern Asian communities in Colombia were not very numerous compared to Brazil or Peru, but still some groups of thousands of migrants arrived from the 20th century with the Japanese and Koreans until the 21st century with the Chinese. It is estimated that the first groups of Asian immigrants arrived in Buenaventura and Barranquilla between 1910-1940 Many Chinese have immigrated to Colombia in recent decades.

Immigration by origin

Africa

Afro-Colombians
Enslaved Africans began being trafficked to Colombia by the beginning of the 16th century. Cartagena de Indias was the main port of entry of slaves into the country during the colonial period and during its highest boom it turned out to be the most lucrative business in the city, trafficking over 1 million enslaved beings through its port. Slavery wouldn't be abolished in Colombia until 1851; although by this point enslaved beings only accounted for 0.76% of the population, since most Afro Colombians were free people of colour.

According to the 2018 national census, 9.34% of Colombians are of full or parcial Black African ancestry, with the largest concentration in the department of Chocó, where they represent 82.1% of the population.  
However, external sources estimates Afro-Colombians are between 15% and 26% of total population. Genetic research shows Subsaharan African admixture in general Colombian population ranges between 9% and 20%.

Western Asia and North Africa
Many Arab immigrants have arrived in Colombia from Egypt, Lebanon, Syria,  Iraq, Jordan and Palestine. The Arabs settled mostly in the northern coast, in cities such as Barranquilla, Cartagena, Santa Marta, and Maicao. Gradually they began to settle inland too (except for Antioquia). Many Colombians of Arab descent derive their origins from Catholics/Maronites from Lebanon or Syria.

Due to the Arab Spring, many Arabs arrived in Colombia seeking political asylum, particularly from Syria.

Chinese and other East Asians
The city of Cali has the largest Asian community because of its proximity to the Pacific Coast; they also live around the nation in other cities such as Barranquilla, Bucaramanga, Bogotá and Medellín. The DANE says the Chinese population is growing 10% every year. In recent years, particularly Chinese restaurants have experienced a surge and have become popular businesses in nearly every Colombian city. 

There is a large gap in knowledge of the Chinese diaspora in Colombia in the period from the beginning of the 20th century until 1970–1980. The century began with the political upheavals in China that led to the creation of two political factions among the Chinese in and outside China, and eventually caused the communist revolution and the founding of the two separate Chinese states, one on the mainland and one in Taiwan. The effect for the Chinese diaspora was the creation not only of political but also more differentiation between migrants and distinguished by locality of origin, language, and history of migration. Thus, until today, in terms of organization, they are, on the one hand, the "Overseas Chinese Association", founded by Chinese who migrated to Colombia in the 1980s, and on the other, the Chinese Cultural Centre in Bogotá, founded in 1988 by a Taiwanese government institution (Zhang 1991).

Moreover, it is known that in 1970 there were over 6,000 Chinese living in Colombia, which means that they kept coming to this country. It can be assumed that the anti-immigrant atmosphere in many countries was the major cause of continued Chinese immigration to Colombia. The migration did not come from China, because during the first three decades of the People's Republic of China, emigration was severely restricted. In fact, it is known that in the early 20th century, due to xenophobia in the United States, a large number of Chinese migrated to Colombia. Restrepo (2001) states that at that time various groups of immigrants settled in Barranquilla. 

The end of Chinese anti-immigration laws in the United States during the 1980s allowed many Chinese to emigrate from Colombia to the United States.  As a result, of the 5,600 people of Chinese origin reported in 1982 (Poston and Yu 1990) in the 1990s were only 3,400, most of whom live in Bogota, Barranquilla, Cali, Cartagena, Medellin, Santa Marta, Manizales, Cucuta, and Pereira. All these movements flow of people around the world support the notion that the "Chinese diaspora" is far from staying in a country, take an identity, or "assimilate". Political, economic, social, and personal issues contributed to the circulation of the Chinese movement between various locations. These factors also have an important influence in the forms of residence and, more recently, in human trafficking.

North American
About 3,000 North Americans arrived in Barranquilla during the late 19th century. By 1958, American immigrants comprised 10% of all immigrants living in Colombia. There are now 60,000 United States citizens living in Colombia, many of whom are Colombian emigrants to the United States who chose to return to Colombia.  The barrios El Prado, Paraiso, and some others were created by Americans, also schools and universities were built by American architects such as the Universidad del Norte, the American School and many more.

When enumerated by citizenship, many Americans are from families that emigrated to the United States and then repatriated.

Jewish
Early Jewish settlers were converted Jews, known as Marranos, from Spain. In the years prior to World War II, there was a second wave of Jewish immigrants fleeing persecution from the Nazis. Most Colombian Jews live in Barranquilla, Cali, Medellín, and Bogotá. There are only nine synagogues throughout the entire country.

Roma
The Roma came during colonial times, often forced by the Spanish to move to South America. Roma people also came during World War I and World War II. Most of them settled in the metropolitan area of Barranquilla.

Spanish
Spanish immigration in what is now Colombia was massive and continuous throughout the colonial period. Spanish descendants, a majority of which mixed to varying degrees with indigenous peoples over the centuries, form the bulk of the Colombian population. After a brief period in which it stopped abruptly following independence, immigration slowly resumed albeit at a much lower level. In the 20th century there was another wave of Spanish immigrants fleeing persecution from the Franquistas during and after the Spanish Civil War. Migration also spiked as a result of economic hardships in Spain during the 50s. Due to high unemployment in Spain, several hundreds of Spaniards have immigrated to Colombia for better working prospects in recent years (2008 onwards). Furthermore, several thousands of Colombians who emigrated to Spain from 1990 to 2010 (about 280,000 people) now return to Colombia, and sometimes have dual citizenship.

Italians
Italian immigration in Colombia has had place in the XIX and XX centuries. The Italian immigrant population in Colombia, is mostly located in cities such as Cartagena, Barranquilla, Santa Marta, Montería, Cali, Medellin and Bogotá. The Italians have left some imprint in Colombian Spanish and gastronomy. The Italian government estimated in 2018 that around 2 million Colombians have Italian ancestry.

Germans
Particularly in the 19th century, but also in the 20th century. Many Colombians of German heritage arrived in Colombia via Venezuela, where 19th-century German settlements have existed. They traditionally settled as farmers or professional workers in the states of Boyacá and Santander, but also in Cali, Bogotá and Barranquilla. One famous German immigrant of the 19th century was German-Jewish entrepreneur Leo Siegfried Kopp who founded the brewery Bavaria. Other German groups arrived in Colombia later: after World War I (many opticians and other professional businesses in Bogotá were founded by German immigrants in the 1910s), and after World War II, some of them Nazis or on the black list. Many of them changed their surnames for common surnames of the region.

Russians
In the 19th and 20th centuries many Russians went to Antioquia and Risaralda, escaping from communism and the Soviet government. The former USSR (1917-1991) included other nations like Lithuania and Ukraine.

Irish
During the independence of Colombia, More than 3.000 Irish soldiers fought to give independence to the contry, many were recruited from Dublin, London and other cities to fight with Simón Bolívar's troops to liberate Colombia from Spain. Subsequently, post-independence Irish immigrants continued to arrive, especially to the departments of Antioquia, Caldas and Risaralda. In the first half of 20th century, Irish people arrived in Colombia for a new life and as missionaries to expand the Catholic faith in the country. In the last years of the 20th century and first years of 21st century, some Irish people came to Colombia. Some came to work in the many multinational companies but a few of them were involved with terrorist groups like the FARC.

French

There is an important French community in Colombia, mainly concentrated in the coastal cities of Barranquilla, Cartagena, and Santa Marta, as well as in Bogotá. French immigration began in a regular pattern during the 18th and 19th century and highly influenced the country's economic and political systems (the Betancourt family is of French descent) and entertainment industry. Another example is Atanasio Girardot who was a Colombian revolutionary leader.  Some WWII refugees from France came to Colombia, but often for a temporary time. Nowadays, Colombia has also become a cheap tourist or retirement destination for French citizens. Contrary to common perceptions, the frequent Colombian surname Betancourt does not signal French descent but rather descent from the Canary Islands (Spain), where it is common since the islands were conquered and submitted by Frenchman Juan de Betancourt for the Spanish crown in the 16th century. French surnames such as Lafaurie, Chaux, Lamouroux, Betancourt and many more are frequently deeply rooted in Colombian society.

Venezuelans
The Venezuelan population in Colombia is estimated at 2,250,000, due to political instability, corruption and crime in Venezuela. Large populations of Venezuelans are found in Bogotá, Cali, Medellín, Bucaramanga, Barranquilla, Cartagena and Cúcuta. Previously Colombians had emigrated to Venezuela due to political unrest. However, during the last decade the trend has reversed and Venezuelans increasingly immigrate to Colombia. A Venezuelan refugee crisis began in 2014; as of 2021, about 1.7 million Venezuelans displaced by the crisis are currently in Colombia, most of whom are either undocumented or are on temporary visas.

Ecuadorians
The history of Colombia and Ecuador is strongly related. Many people of South Colombia (specially, the Nariño, Putumayo and Cauca Departments) share traditions with the Ecuadorian people. This has led to migration between both countries. Many Ecuadorians have come to the major cities of Colombia (Bogotá, Medellin, Cali, Bucaramanga) as merchants.

Numbers of people by nationality in Colombia based on 2019 official figures

Number of people with permanent Colombian residence by nationality 
Note: only people that have lived in Colombia for at least 5 years can acquire permanent residence.

Number of people living in Colombia by Nationality 2017 

South America

Europe

Asia

Africa

Oceania

Total 138,920

See also
Colombian diaspora
Demographics of Colombia
Emigration from Colombia

References

External links
 http://www.colarte.com/recuentos/Colecciones/ETNIAS/xNorteamericanos.htm 
  University of the North
 Colegio Marymount
 Colegio Karl C. Parrish
 Colegio Americano de Barranquilla
 http://www.delasalle.edu.co/Biffi_Salle/index.asp
 http://www.delasalle.edu.co/InstitutoLaSalle/index.asp
 http://lablaa.org/blaavirtual/revistas/credencial/julio2005/vuelo.htm 
 http://www.vanguardia.com/unidad/uni090504.htm

Further reading
 Massey, Douglas S., Arango, Joaquín, Graeme, Hugo, Kouaouci, Ali, Pellegrino, Adela and Taylor, J. Edward (2005), Worlds in Motion: Understanding International Migration at the End of the Millennium, New York: Oxford University Press, .

 
Human migration
Foreign relations of Colombia
Economy of Colombia